The ISU Holiday Classic was a four-team college basketball tournament typically held during the early part of NCAA Division I men's basketball season, with the inaugural tournament beginning in 1995 and lasting until 1999. Games were hosted at Iowa State University's Hilton Coliseum.

All-time brackets

1995 ISU Holiday Classic

1996 ISU Holiday Classic

1997 ISU Holiday Classic

1998 The Tribune Holiday Classic

1999 The Tribune Holiday Classic

All-time results

References

College men's basketball competitions in the United States
Iowa State Cyclones men's basketball
1995 establishments in Iowa
1999 disestablishments in Iowa